Richard J. Mendenhall (1828–1906) was an American born businessman, very active in the Minnesota business world of the late 19th century.

Early life
Mendenhall was born in Jamestown, North Carolina on November 25, 1828. He attended school in New England, Ohio and, in 1853, returned to North Carolina.  He subsequently went to New York and, in 1855, moved to Iowa as a civil engineer. In 1856, he moved to Minneapolis, Minnesota.

Marriage
Mr. Mendenhall was married February 11, 1858, to Abby G. Swift, of Massachusetts. They had no children. She died in 1900.

Later life and career
In 1862 he is listed as the President of the State Bank of Minnesota. He participated in Minnesota Floriculture by owning greenhouses. Mendenhall met and provided encouragement to Albert Butz, a Swiss born American inventor and businessman whose early patents led him to found the company which became Honeywell.

Mendenhall died at his home in Minneapolis on October 19, 1906.

References

Further reading

External links
 Biographies from "History of Hennepin County and the City of Minneapolis
State Bank of Minnesota Information
A history of Minnesota Floriculture (from U of Minnesota)

1828 births
1906 deaths
Businesspeople from Minneapolis
19th-century American businesspeople